Steve Erwin (born January 16, 1960) is an American comics artist best known as the co-creator of Checkmate and Gunfire for DC Comics.

Career
Erwin studied commercial art at Oklahoma State University-Okmulgee. He credits Neal Adams' Batman stories and Gene Colan/Tom Palmer's work on Daredevil as having "won my heart in junior high to aspiring (dreaming) to be a comic book artist." Erwin's first published comic book work appeared in Grimjack #18 (Jan. 1986)  published by First Comics. During the 1980s and 1990s, he worked primarily for DC Comics, his first story for that publisher appearing in The Vigilante #48 (Dec. 1987). After that title's cancellation, Erwin co-created the title Checkmate! with writer Paul Kupperberg. In August 1991, Erwin and Marv Wolfman launched the Deathstroke The Terminator title, a series which Erwin would draw from 1991 to 1994. The Gunfire character was created by Len Wein and Erwin in Deathstroke the Terminator Annual #3 (October 1993). Erwin drew the comics adaptation of Batman Returns as well as Star Trek: The Next Generation Shadowheart, the graphic novel adaptation of The Ashes of Eden, and the Mike Danger series published by Tekno Comix.

In 2007, Erwin was inducted into the Oklahoma Cartoonists Hall of Fame in Pauls Valley, Oklahoma, located in the Toy and Action Figure Museum.

Bibliography

DC Comics
 
 Batman Returns: The Official Comic Adaptation of the Warner Bros. Motion Picture #1 (1992)
 Checkmate #1–8, 11–13, 15, 17–25, 30 (1988–1990)
 Deathstroke, The Terminator #1–9, 13, 17–21, 26–27, 29–34, Annual #2 (1991–1994)
 Gunfire #1–5 (1994)
 Hawk and Dove vol. 3 #21–22 (1991)
 New Gods vol. 3 #23–25 (1991)
 The New Titans #68–70 (1990)
 Showcase '96 #5 (1996)
 Star Trek #79, Special #3 (1995–1996)
 Star Trek: The Next Generation Shadowheart #1–4 (1994–1995)
 Star Trek: The Next Generation Special #2 (1994)
 Superboy vol. 3 #23 (1996)
 Superman: The Man of Steel #38 (1994)
 Titans Sell-Out Special #1 (1993)
 Vigilante #48–50 (1987–1988)
 Who's Who in the DC Universe #6–7 (1991)
 Who's Who: The Definitive Directory of the DC Universe #16 (1986)
 Who's Who Update '88 #1, 4 (1988)

First Comics
 Grimjack #18–20 (1986)
 Shatter #3–7 (1986–1987)

Malibu Comics
 The Ferret #5–6 (1993)
 Star Trek: Deep Space Nine Worf Special #0 (1995)
 Ultraforce #7 (1995)

Marvel Comics
 ID4: Independence Day #0, 2 (1996)
 Star Trek: Operation Assimilation #1 (1997)

References

External links
 
 Steve Erwin at the Lambiek Comiclopedia
 Steve Erwin at Mike's Amazing World of Comics

1960 births
20th-century American artists
21st-century American artists
American comics artists
Artists from Tulsa, Oklahoma
DC Comics people
Living people
Marvel Comics people
Oklahoma State University alumni